Magsaysay, officially the Municipality of Magsaysay, is a 3rd class municipality in the province of Davao del Sur, Philippines. According to the 2020 census, it has a population of 56,263 people.

As with much of the rural area of Davao del Sur, the predominant economic activity is based on rice farming.

History
The whole area under jurisdiction of the municipality of Magsaysay were all once part of Bansalan. It was populated firstly by Bagobos and Manobos until settlers from the Visayas came to the area and eventually became the dominant ethnicity of the area. The most populous village in the area was Kialeg, now the town center, which was renamed Magsaysay in 1959 in honor of the late president Ramon Magsaysay.

The municipality of Magsaysay was created from 18 barangays of Bansalan on June 17, 1967 signed by President Ferdinand Marcos. Barangay Magsaysay, formerly and still colloquially known in the present as Kialeg, became the town center of the newly created municipality and was thus was officially renamed Barangay Poblacion.

A magnitude 6.3 earthquake struck at Magsaysay on February 7, 2021, resulting in some damage to property to the nearby towns and cities.

Geography

Climate

Barangays
Magsaysay is politically subdivided into 22 barangays.

Demographics

Economy

Media
 Kastigador Balita Mindanao (Weekly Newspaper)
 95.3 MHz DXET Radyo Kastigo Magsaysay

References

External links

   Magsaysay Profile at the DTI Cities and Municipalities Competitive Index
 [ Philippine Standard Geographic Code]
 Philippine Census Information
 Local Governance Performance Management System

Municipalities of Davao del Sur